Juan Castellanos (born 7 January 1975) is a Venezuelan former footballer. He played in one match for the Venezuela national football team in 1997. He was also part of Venezuela's squad for the 1993 Copa América tournament.

References

External links
 

1975 births
Living people
Venezuelan footballers
Venezuela international footballers
Place of birth missing (living people)
Association football midfielders
C.S. Marítimo de Venezuela players
Carabobo F.C. players
Venezuelan expatriate footballers
Expatriate footballers in Portugal